El viaje macho is a 2016 Peruvian drama road movie written, produced, and directed by Luis Basurto in his directorial debut. It stars Luis Ramírez. It is about 2 ex-prisoners who embark on a journey in search of the last freedom by getting on the "male train".

Synopsis 
Dr. Carlos Espejo has served a long and unjust sentence, and upon leaving he discovers a modern society different from the one he knew. The years in prison have changed his life: his son has moved away from the pressure of his father's conviction, and the search for his old friends and colleagues yields no results. With little to cling to in the city, Carlos will let himself be carried away by the Andean ravine riding the mythical "male train" guiding Nazario, a blind man he met in prison. Both will persevere to adapt to a changing world, embarking on the macho journey towards their ultimate freedom.

Cast 
The actors participating in this film are:

 Luis Ramírez as Dr. Carlos Espejo
 Amiel Cayo as Nazario
 Magaly Solier
 Juan Ubaldo Huamán

Financing 
In 2009, the film was financially supported by the Ibermedia program. 3 years later, the film obtained S/.440,000 to start the formal production of the film after having won a Fiction Feature Film Works Project Contest awarded by the Ministry of Culture of Peru.

Release

Festivals 
El viaje macho premiered on July 8, 2016, at the Lima Independiente Festival 2016. Before its commercial premiere, it participated in the 30th Biarritz Latin America Film Festival (France), the 6th Quito Latin American Film Festival (Ecuador) and the 6th Trujillo Film Festival 2019 (Peru).

Comercial release 
The film was scheduled to be released commercially in April 2020 in Peruvian theaters but it was canceled due to the COVID-19 pandemic. Finally, it was commercially released on November 25, 2021, in Peruvian theaters.

Awards

References 

2016 films
2016 drama films
Peruvian drama road movies
2010s drama road movies
2010s Spanish-language films
2010s Peruvian films
Films set in Peru
Films shot in Peru
Films about old age
Films about travel
2016 directorial debut films
Films impacted by the COVID-19 pandemic